The following is a list of players and who appeared in at least one game for the Washington Senators franchise of Major League Baseball, which played as the Washington Statesmen in the American Association in  and as the Senators in the National League from  until . Players in bold are in the Baseball Hall of Fame.



A
Bert Abbey
Charlie Abbey
Billy Alvord
Doc Amole
John Anderson
Varney Anderson
Charlie Atherton

B
Jersey Bakely
Kirtley Baker
Shad Barry
Ed Beecher
Tun Berger
Frank Bonner
Andy Boswell
Jake Boyd
Roger Bresnahan
Tom Brown
Fred Buckingham
Jim Burns 
Dick Butler

C
Count Campau
Charlie Carr
Kid Carsey
Ed Cartwright
Doc Casey
Ed Cassian
Pete Cassidy
Dan Coogan
Jimmy Cooney
Joe Corbett
Bill Coughlin
Jack Crooks
Ervin Curtis

D
Ed Daily
Harry Davis
Jumbo Davis
George Decker
Gene DeMontreville
Bill Dinneen
John Dolan
Wild Bill Donovan
Patsy Donovan
Tommy Dowd
Tom Dowse
Jack Doyle
Jake Drauby
Charlie Duffee
Dan Dugdale
Jim Duncan
Davey Dunkle
Fred Dunlap
Jesse Duryea

E
Bill Eagle
Rip Egan
Ed Eiteljorge
Duke Esper
Roy Evans

F
Duke Farrell
Jim Field
Jack Fifield
Carney Flynn
Frank Foreman
Bill Fox
Buck Freeman

G
Hank Gastright
Frank Gatins
Les German
Jake Gettman
Jack Gilbert
John Gilroy
Jack Glasscock
Ed Glenn
John Graff
Sandy Griffin

H
George Haddock
Tom Hart
Bill Hassamaer
Gil Hatfield
Lefty Herring
Mike Heydon
Paul Hines
Dummy Hoy
Billy Hulen

I
Bert Inks

J
Alex Jones
Bill Joyce

K
George Keefe
Frank Killen
Matt Kilroy
Silver King
Tom Kinslow
Malachi Kittridge
Phil Knell

L
Henry Larkin
Arlie Latham
Tom Leahy
Bill Leith
Pete Lohman
Billy Lush

M
Harry Mace
Bill Magee
Dan Mahoney
John Malarkey
Al Maul
Al McCauley
Bill McCauley
Pat McCauley
Dan McFarlan
Dan McGann
Deacon McGuire
Bob McHale
Doc McJames
Tom McLaughlin
Frank McManus
Mart McQuaid
Mox McQuery
Jouett Meekin
Win Mercer
Bob Miller
Kohly Miller
Jocko Milligan
Kid Mohler
Carlton Molesworth
Joe Mulvey
Larry Murphy
Miah Murray
Bert Myers

N
Parson Nicholson
Effie Norton

O
Jack O'Brien
John O'Brien
Hal O'Hagan
Jim O'Rourke
Tim O'Rourke

P
Dick Padden
Charlie Petty
Doc Potts
Doc Powers
Oscar Purner

Q
Bill Quarles

R
Paul Radford
Harry Raymond
Charlie Reilley
Heinie Reitz
Danny Richardson
Hardy Richardson
Dorsey Riddlemoser
Mike Roach
Yank Robinson
Jim Rogers

S
Frank Scheibeck
Kip Selbach
Dan Shannon
Frank Shannon
Jimmy Slagle
Mike Slattery
Will Smalley
Harvey Smith
Jud Smith
Pop Smith
Pop Snyder
General Stafford
Joe Stanley
Ben Stephens
Otis Stocksdale
Cub Stricker 
Willie Sudhoff
Joe Sugden
Joe Sullivan
Marty Sullivan 
Mike Sullivan
Sy Sutcliffe
Jack Suthoff
Cy Swaim

T
George Tebeau
Tommy Tucker
Larry Twitchell

U
George Ulrich

V
Joe Visner

W
Butts Wagner
Piggy Ward
Charlie Weber
Gus Weyhing
Pop Williams
Sam Wise
Phil Wisner
Joe Woerlin
Zeke Wrigley
Bill Wynne

External links
Baseball Reference

 
Major League Baseball all-time rosters